The Division 2 season 1999/2000, organised by the LFP was won by Lille OSC and saw the promotions of Lille OSC, EA Guingamp and Toulouse FC, whereas Amiens SC, ASOA Valence and CS Louhans-Cuiseaux were relegated to National.

20 participating teams

 Ajaccio
 Amiens
 Caen
 Cannes
 Châteauroux
 Créteil
 Gueugnon
 Guingamp
 Laval
 Le Mans
 Lille
 Lorient
 Louhans-Cuiseaux
 Nice
 Nîmes
 Niort
 Sochaux
 Toulouse
 Valence
 Wasquehal

League table

Recap
 Promoted to L1: Lille OSC, EA Guingamp, Toulouse FC 
 Relegated to L2: AS Nancy, Le Havre AC, Montpellier HSC
 Promoted to L2: AS Beauvais, FC Martigues, Angers SCO
 Relegated to National: Amiens SC, ASOA Valence, CS Louhans-Cuiseaux

Results

Top goalscorers

External links
RSSSF archives of results

Ligue 2 seasons
French
2